Kostas Vasilakakis (born 27 March 1957) is a Greek football manager and former footballer. His career began in 1973 at the age of 16 when he signed a contract with Panthrakikos. He was transferred to Doxa Drama in 1981 and fought in Alpha Ethniki for thirteen years. He ended his career as footballer of Doxa Drama in 1995 at the age of 38.

Career

As football player
Vasilakakis began his career as striker. He later changed football position and became established as a defensive midfielder and central defender. In Panthrakikos he played eight seasons – seven in the Beta Ethniki, one in Gamma Ethniki. Playing in the first level until 38 years old, from 1981 to 1995 he played thirteen seasons in the Alpha Ethniki (now Super League) and one season in the Beta Ethniki. Vasilakakis is leading the list of appearances of the players of Doxa Drama with 226+ (no data for 1981–82) appearances in Alpha Ethniki.
He was α leader on both teams.

As football manager
He was hired and worked at Panthrakikos F.C. as football manager from the summer of 2004 until 2008 (with the exception of the first half of the 2006–2007 season). He was the most successful football manager in the club's history. In four seasons he won the three most significant promotions, from Delta Ethniki to the Super League Greece.
As a football manager of Doxa Drama succeeded in promotion from Gamma Ethniki to Beta Ethniki in the 2008–2009 season.
In his coaching career he was coach of the following groups:
 1999–2001 Aris Photolivos
 2001–2003 Pandramaikos F.C.
 2003–2004 Prosotsani
 2004–2006 Panthrakikos F.C.
 2006–2007 Doxa Drama F.C. and Panthrakikos F.C.
 2007–2008 Panthrakikos F.C.
 2008–2010 Doxa Drama F.C.
 2010 Panthrakikos F.C.
 2012-     Kavala F.C.

See also
Football League (Greece)
Doxa Drama F.C.

References

External links
 
 Alex. Mastrogiannopoulos (82.html to 95.html)

1957 births
Living people
Panthrakikos F.C. players
Greek footballers
Greek football managers
Kavala F.C. managers
Association football utility players
People from Rhodope (regional unit)
Footballers from Eastern Macedonia and Thrace